731 Signal Squadron is a Canadian Army communication unit headquartered at Canadian Forces Base Shilo, near Brandon, Manitoba.  The unit is responsible to provide communication information systems, strategic infrastructure services and support to Army Regular Force and Reserve Force units in Saskatchewan, Manitoba and northwestern Ontario.

731 Signal Squadron Role

The role of 731 Signal Squadron is to enable successful command support in Canadian Army units through the provision of non-tactical communication and information systems throughout Saskatchewan, Manitoba, and northwestern Ontario.

Organization

731 Signal Squadron is composed of a unit headquarters and two troops - Maintenance Troop and Information Systems Troop.  These troops provide a wide range of services, including management of telephone systems, repair of communication devices, computer network management and software support.

The Squadron Headquarters is responsible for command and control of the unit, providing direction to its member organizations, and conducting liaison and coordination with those who are supported.  Key personnel are the unit Commanding Officer, Deputy Commanding Officer and Squadron Sergeant Major.  Grouped as part of the Headquarters are the Squadron Orderly Room and the Operations and Training Cell.

References

External links 
  731 Signal Squadron

Military communications squadrons of Canada
Military units and formations of the Canadian Army